Maher is a surname. It can be derived from the Irish surname Ó Meachair, but is also found in the Arabic and Pakistani regions.

People
Alphabetically:
Adam Maher (born 1993), Dutch-Moroccan footballer
Ahmad or Ahmed Maher, several people, including:
Ahmad Maher (diplomat) (1935–2010), Egyptian diplomat
Ahmad Maher (director), Egyptian film director
Ahmad Maher (footballer) (born 1990), Egyptian footballer
Ahmad Mahir Pasha (1888–1945), Prime Minister of Egypt, grandfather of the above
Ahmad Maher Wridat (born 1991), Palestinian football player
Ahmed Maher (youth leader) (born 1980), co-founder of the April 6 Youth Movement in Egypt
Ali Maher (diplomat) (1938–2016), Egyptian diplomat
Alice Maher (born 1956), Irish painter and sculptor
Allan Maher (born 1950), Australian football player
Andrew Maher (born 1964), Australian sports journalist and broadcaster
Ben Maher (born 1983), British show jumper
Big Joe Maher (born c.1953), American blues drummer, singer and songwriter
Bill Maher (born 1956), American comedian and late-night talk show host
Bill Maher (rower) (born 1946), American rower
Brendan Maher (disambiguation), several people, including:
Brendan Maher (born 1989), Irish name Breandán Ó Meachair, Irish hurler
Brendan Maher (director), director of Australian TV series
Brendan Maher (psychologist) (1924–2009), professor at Harvard University
Brendan Maher (Roscrea hurler) (born 1949), Irish name Breandán Ó Meachair, Irish hurler
Brett Maher (American football) (born 1989), American gridiron football player
Brett Maher (basketball) (born 1973), Australian basketball player
Carmel Maher (born 1954), Australian politician
Christopher Maher (born 1955), American actor and chef
Ciarán Maher (1962–2012), Irish name Ciarán Ó Meachair, Irish Gaelic footballer
Davie Maher (1880–1936), English footballer
Denis Maher (born 1991), Irish name Denis Ó Meachair, Irish hurler
Edwin Maher, New Zealand-born TV journalist
Frank Maher (disambiguation), several people
Fred Maher (born 1964), American drummer, programmer, and record producer
George Ciccariello-Maher (born 1979), American political theorist
George W. Maher (1864–1926), American architect
Greg Maher (1967–2016), Irish name Gréagóir Ó Meachair, Irish Gaelic footballer
Irene Maher, Australian artist who worked with Vivienne Binns in the 1990s
James or Jimmy Maher, several people, including:
James Maher (hurler) (born 1995), Irish name Séamus Ó Meachair, Irish hurler
James J. Maher, American Catholic priest and president of Niagara University
James Joseph Maher (1888–1964), New Zealand politician of the National Party
James P. Maher (1865–1946), U.S. Representative from New York
Jimmy Maher (born 1974), Australian cricketer
Jimmy Maher (footballer) (1913–1977), Australian rules footballer
Jimmy Maher (hurler), Irish hurler
John Maher (also Johnny, Jonathan), several people, including:
John Maher (Buzzcocks drummer) (born 1960), British drummer and drag racer
John Maher (Kilkenny hurler) (born 1977), Irish name Seán Ó Meachair, Irish hurler
John Maher (Tipperary hurler) (1908–1980), Irish name Seán Ó Meachair, Irish hurler
John A. Maher, American politician
John C. Maher (born 1951), Irish-British linguist
John W. Maher (1866–1917), American politician and veterinarian
Johnny Marr (born 1963), born John Martin Maher, English guitarist for The Smiths
Jonathan Maher (born 1985), Irish name Seán Ó Meachair, Irish hurler
Joseph Maher (1933–1998), Irish-American character actor
Kaitlyn Maher (born 2004), American singer and actress
Katherine Maher (born 1983), American executive director of the Wikimedia Foundation
Kevin Maher (born 1976), English-born Irish footballer
Margaret Maher (1841–1924), Irish-born domestic worker for Emily Dickinson
Matt Maher (born 1974), Canadian Christian music songwriter and worship leader
Matty Maher (1854–1931), Irish name Maitiú Ó Meachair, Irish hurler
Maureen Maher, American news reporter
Michael Maher (also Mikey), several people, including:
Michael Maher (Australian politician) (1936–2013), Member of Parliament from 1982–1987
Michael Maher (hurler) (1930–2017), Irish name Mícheál Ó Meachair, Irish hurler
Michael 'Moegie' Maher, mayor of County Galway, 2011–12, 2022-present
Michael Whalen Maher (1830–1905), architect, builder and politician in New Brunswick
Mikey Maher (1870–1947), Irish hurler
Nicholas Maher (died 1851), Irish politician
Osama Ali Maher (born 1968), Egyptian-born Swedish politician and MP
Patrick Maher (also Pádraic, Pat), several people, including:
Pádraic Maher (born 1989), Irish name Pádraic Ó Meachair, Irish hurler
Pat Maher "Fox" (1872–1933), Irish hurler
Patrick Maher (hurler) "Bonner" (born 1989), Irish name Pádraig Ó Meachair, Irish hurler
Patrick Maher (Irish republican) (1889–1921), IRA member executed in Mountjoy Prison
Paul Maher, several people, including:
Paul Maher Jr. (born 1963), American author, book critic, photographer and filmmaker
Paul Maher (footballer) (born 1976), Australian rules footballer
Paul Maher (Moyne-Templetuohy hurler) (born 1994), Irish name Pól Ó Meachair, Irish hurler
Peter Maher (also Peadar), several people, including:
Peadar Maher (1924–2012), Irish politician
Peter Maher (boxer) (1869–1940), Irish-American bare-knuckle boxer
Peter Maher (hurler) (1872–1947), Irish name Peadar Ó Meachair, Irish hurler
Peter Maher (runner) (born 1960), Canadian marathon runner
Peter Maher (sportscaster) (born 1949), Canadian sportscaster
Philip Maher (born 1979), Irish hurler
Richard Maher, British screenwriter and producer
Robyn Maher (born 1959), Australian basketball player
Ronan Maher (born 1995), Irish name Rónán Ó Meachair, Irish hurler
Sanam Maher, Pakistani journalist and feminist
Sean Maher (born 1975), American actor
Sean Maher (swimmer) (born 1953), British swimmer
Shaun Maher (born 1978), Irish footballer
Shiraz Maher (born 1981), British writer, critic of radical Islam
Stephen Maher (footballer) (born 1988), Irish footballer
Stephen Maher (hurler) "Picky" (born 1993), Irish name Stiofán Ó Meachair, Irish hurler
T. J. Maher (1922–2002), full name Thomas Joseph Maher, Irish politician
Ted Maher (born 1958), American arson, ex-Green Beret, and registered nurse
Ted Maher (politician) (1891–1982), Australian politician
Therese Maher, Irish name Treasa Ní Meachair, Irish camogie player
Tom Maher (born 1952), Australian basketball coach
Tommy Maher (1922–2015), Irish name Tomás Ó Meachair, Catholic priest and hurler
Tony Maher (born 1945), Irish name Antoin Ó Meachair, Irish hurler
Wally Maher (1908–1951), American actor
Warren Maher (born 1957), Australian tennis player
William Maher (hurler) (born 1979), Irish name Liam Ó Meachair, Irish hurler and coach